Hans-Joachim Kroschinski (11 May 1920 – 7 January 1995) was a former Luftwaffe fighter ace and recipient of the Knight's Cross of the Iron Cross during World War II.

Claimed aerial victories

Serving with 2./JG 54 Kroschinski gained his first known Soviet victory, a MiG-3 on 5 August 1942. He had a total of four by the end of 1942. On 21 December 1944 while flying  Fw 190 A-9 (W.Nr.380360) "Yellow 6", he shot down five Pe-2 bombers, but was then seriously wounded by return fire from other Pe-2s over Frauenburg.

He bailed out of his Fw-190 but as a result of his wounds lost both eyes and his right leg.

Lieutenant Hans-Joachim Kroschinski was credited with at least 76 victories, all recorded over the Eastern Front in 360 missions, including 240 low level attacks. Included in his total is 15 Il-2 Sturmoviks, 2 tanks, a Gun Boat on Lake Ladoga, and 2 MTB's in the Finnish Bay.

Summary of career

Aerial victory claims
According to Heaton, Lewis, Olds and Schulze, Kroschinski was credited with 76 aerial victories. Spick also lists him with 76 aerial victories claimed in 360 combat missions. Mathews and Foreman, authors of Luftwaffe Aces — Biographies and Victory Claims, researched the German Federal Archives and found documentation for 74 aerial victories, plus two further unconfirmed claims, all of which claimed on the Eastern Front.

Awards
 Iron Cross (1939) 2nd and 1st Class
 Wound Badge in Gold
 Front Flying Clasp of the Luftwaffe in Gold
 Honour Goblet of the Luftwaffe on 11 October 1943 as Feldwebel and pilot
 German Cross in Gold on 27 October 1943 as Feldwebel in the 2./Jagdgeschwader 54
 Knight's Cross of the Iron Cross on 17 April 1945 as Oberfeldwebel and pilot in the 3./Jagdgeschwader 54

References

Bibliography

 
 
 
 
 
 
 

1920 births
1995 deaths
Luftwaffe pilots
People from Zalewo
People from East Prussia
German World War II flying aces
Recipients of the Knight's Cross of the Iron Cross